Nueva Gerona is a Cuban city, capital of the Isla de la Juventud special municipality and province. As of 2012, its population was 59,049.

History
The city was founded in 1830 by Francisco Dionisio Vives, who was the Spanish governor of Cuba at the time. There is an American graveyard in Nueva Gerona.

Geography
Nueva Gerona is located by the coast, in the north-eastern area of the island, between the hills of Caballos and Casas. It is crossed by the river Río Las Casas, which provides a navigable waterway to the Caribbean Sea.

The city is divided into the repartos (quarters) of Centro, Abel Santamaría, Sierra Caballo, Nazareno, Saigón, Chacón and José Martí. In the suburban quarter of Chacón is located the Presidio Modelo, a former prison and now a museum.

Transport
Nueva Gerona is linked to La Fe (or Santa Fe), the 2nd most populated town of the island, with the 15 km-long expressway. The harbour in Río Las Casas estuary provides to link it to Cuban mainland, at the port of Surgidero de Batabanó. Near the suburban quarter named José Martí, the Rafael Cabrera Mustelier Airport is located at.

Sport 
Professional baseball and football clubs representing Isla de la Juventud are based in Nueva Gerona. The city houses the Piratas de La Isla de La Juventud baseball club at the Estadio Cristóbal Labra. The club plays in the Cuban National Series, the country's primary domestic professional baseball competition. The city also houses , which plays in the country's top football division, the Campeonato Nacional de Fútbol de Cuba.

Twin towns
Nueva Gerona has the following sister city:
 Girona, Spain

See also

Cayo Largo
List of cities in Cuba
Municipalities of Cuba
1917 Nueva Gerona hurricane

References

External links

 Nueva Gerona municipal website
 Nueva Gerona on "Guije" website

 
Cities in Cuba
Populated places in Isla de la Juventud
Port cities and towns in Cuba
Populated places established in 1802
1802 establishments in New Spain
1800s establishments in the Spanish West Indies
1800s in Cuba